Meyami District ) is a former district (bakhsh) in Shahrud County, Semnan Province, Iran. At the 2006 census, its population was 36,824, in 9,583 families.  The District had one city: Meyami.  The District had five rural districts (dehestan): Forumad Rural District, Kalat-e Hay-ye Sharqi Rural District, Meyami Rural District, Nardin Rural District, and Rezvan Rural District. The district became Meyami County in 2011.

References 

Former districts of Iran
Former districts of Semnan Province
Shahrud County
2011 disestablishments in Iran